Computer and Video Games (also known as CVG, Computer & Video Games, C&VG, Computer + Video Games, or C+VG) was a UK-based video game magazine, published in its original form between 1981 and 2004. Its offshoot website was launched in 1999 and closed in February 2015. CVG was the longest-running video game media brand in the world.

History
Computer and Video Games was established in 1981, being the first British games magazine. Initially published monthly between November 1981 and October 2004 and solely web-based from 2004 onwards, the magazine was one of the first publications to capitalise on the growing home computing market, although it also covered arcade games.  At the time of launch it was the world's first dedicated video games magazine. The first issue featured articles on Space Invaders, Chess, Othello and advice on how to learn programming.

The magazine had a typical ABC of 106,000.

Website
Launched in August 1999, CVG was one of the UK and Europe's leading gaming web sites. Primarily known for its news service, CVG also features a mix of current and next-generation multi-format gaming reviews, previews, features and interviews, as well as a new emphasis on video and multimedia content.

CVG was originally owned by EMAP, before being bought by Dennis Publishing. In 2004 CVG was acquired by Future Publishing who remain its current owners. In 2006, the site underwent a major re-design and relaunch to bring it up to scratch for the so-called next generation of Xbox 360, PlayStation 3 and Wii gaming.

In 2007, CVG became the hub of a new CVG Network, hosting magazine sites for all of Future Publishing's unofficial gaming magazines including PC Gamer, PC Zone, Xbox World 360, PlayStation World, PSM3 and NGamer as well as long standing cheats site, CheatStation.

The CVG Network expanded further in May 2007 to include sites like Xbox 360 Magazine, Edge and Next Generation.biz.
CVG also has a very popular forum with many users and topics. CVG has also had a cult following with an award thread they used to run known as the yakkies.

In May 2007, CVG submitted to electronic audit by the Audit Bureau of Circulation and registered 1.56 million monthly unique users and 11.4 million page impressions.

Future has since incorporated the forums of many of its other games related publications to ComputerAndVideoGames.com in addition to devoting sections to those that did not previously have a formal website, such as PC Gamer.

In early 2014, CVG, amongst other Future-operated websites, was earmarked for closure by management, but instead received staff cuts in July.
Future announced the closure of the website in December 2014. The website closed on 26 February 2015, with all pages redirecting to Gamesradar+, another Future publication.

YouTube channel 
Until the closure of CVG, their official YouTube channel provided a variety of video game related content, providing everything from walkthroughs of games to news regarding video game consoles and regarding gaming events. Their second longest running series, GTA V O'clock covered news and conspiracy theories regarding Rockstar Games' Grand Theft Auto V and Grand Theft Auto Online. It was one of the few publications invited to see and play Grand Theft Auto V before its release to the public on 17 September 2013 and re-release for PC on 14 April 2015.

CVG Presents

When the magazine did reappear it was in a new form, titled CVG Presents, on 16 April 2008 with a bi-monthly release schedule. The new format concentrates the whole magazine on a single subject.  The first issue of the new format concentrated on the history of the Grand Theft Auto series of games. CVG Presents has not been published since 2009.

Golden Joystick Awards

CVG hosted the annual Golden Joystick Awards, the longest running gaming ceremony in the world and widely acknowledged as one of the most prestigious, as they're voted for solely by the general gaming public. Originally created in 1982 as the CVG magazine's annual awards ceremony, the awards moved onto the web with CVG.com in 1999.

In April 1983, the magazine published the results of its first Golden Joystick Awards, along with pictures from the ceremony in Berkeley Square. DJ Dave Lee Travis presented the award for best game of the year to Jetpac.

The 2006 Golden Joystick awards attracted over 540,000 votes and were webcast for the first time. The Golden Joystick Awards entered their 25th Silver Anniversary year in 2007 and attracted over 750,000 votes from gamers around the world, with Microsoft's Gears of War winning four Joysticks including Ultimate Game of the Year.

Editors of ComputerAndVideoGames.com
 Gareth Ramsay
 Julian Rignall
 Johnny Minkley (early 2004)
 Stuart Bishop (acting Ed mid-2004)
 John Houlihan (2004–2006)
 Gavin Ogden (2006–2009)
 Tim Ingham (2010–2011)
 Andy Robinson (2012–2015)

Editor-in-Chief
 John Houlihan (2009–2011)

References

External links 
  at the Internet Archive
 Computer and Video Games Magazine Issue Archive

Home computer magazines
Magazines established in 1981
Magazines disestablished in 2004
Magazines established in 2008
Magazines published in London
Monthly magazines published in the United Kingdom
Video game magazines published in the United Kingdom
Video game websites